Wheelchair tennis at the 2010 Asian Para Games were held in Tianhe Tennis School, Guangzhou, China PR, from December 13 to December 18. There were 4 gold medals in this sport.

Medal summary

Medal table
Retrieved from Asian Para Games 2010 Official Website.

Medalists

Result

Men's singles

Finals

Consolation

Men's doubles

Women's singles

Women's doubles

References

Wheelchair tennis
Asian Para Games
2010 Asian Para Games